All the Way to the Sun is the ninth studio album by the Norwegian hard rock band TNT. The album was first rumoured to be on the heavy side of TNT, but came out in the end as a more straight forward pop rock album. It did not get as many positive reviews as My Religion but was still regarded as a fairly good TNT album. It also sold less than the previous album. The band toured Norway to support the release as well as shows in Sweden, the UK and in Spain where they recorded what became Live in Madrid before Tony Harnell left the band for professional and personal reasons. "Driving" has been played before several major car races in the USA.

Track listing
 "A Fix" - 4:04
 "Too Late" - 3:46
 "Driving" - 4:05
 "Me and I" - 3:43
 "Sometimes" - 4:09
 "All the Way to the Sun" - 5:04
 "What a Wonderful World" - 3:04
 "The Letter" - 4:02
 "Mastic Pines" - 1:25
 "Black Butterfly" - 2:59
 "Save Your Love" - 3:58
 "Ready To Fly" - 4:36
 "Get What You Give" - 4:36 (Japanese Bonus Track)

Personnel

Band 
Tony Harnell – vocals
Ronni Le Tekrø – guitars, backing vocals on "Save Your Love"
Diesel Dahl – drums, percussion

Associated members
Sid Ringsby – bass guitar
Dag Stokke – keyboards

Additional personnel
Bruno Ravel - additional background vocals on "Me and I"
Amy Anderson-Harnell - additional background vocals on "Me and I"

Album credits
 Produced by Tony Harnell and Ronni Le Tekrø
 Engineered by Kjartan Hesthagen
 Mastering & mixing by Tommy Hansen

Sources
http://www.ronniletekro.com/discography-album-27.html

2005 albums
TNT (Norwegian band) albums